The NECW Triple Crown Heavyweight Championship was the top professional wrestling championship in New England Championship Wrestling. It was originally known as the NECW Heavyweight Championship until unified with the PWF Northeast and Mayhem championships.  NECW closed on November 6, 2010, and its Triple Crown Champion "The Real Deal" Brandon Locke was recognized as the PWF Northeast Heavyweight Champion. Six months later, NECW reopened and recognized Locke as the NECW Heavyweight Champion.

Title history

References

NECW Heavyweight Championship History
NECW Triple Crown Heavyweight Championship History

External links
 	NECW Heavyweight Championship
Heavyweight wrestling championships